The 1999 Arena Football League season was the 13th season of the Arena Football League. It was succeeded by 2000. The league champions were the Albany Firebirds, who defeated the Orlando Predators in ArenaBowl XIII.

Standings

 Green indicates clinched playoff berth
 Purple indicates division champion
 Grey indicates best regular season record

Playoffs

All-Arena team

References